The Men's marathon T51 was a marathon event in athletics at the 1996 Summer Paralympics, for wheelchair athletes. Canada won gold and silver in this race courtesy of their winning athletes Brent McMahon and Clayton Gerein. McMahon beat Gerein to the winning gold in a photo finish. Of the thirteen starters, twelve reached the finish line.

Results

See also
 Marathon at the Paralympics

References 

Men's marathon T51
1996 marathons
Marathons at the Paralympics
Men's marathons